Lee Wilson (born 23 May 1972 in Mansfield, England) is a former professional footballer and former first team manager of various non-league clubs including Shepshed Dynamo. He once scored for the mighty Stags against local rivals, Chesterfield.

On 17 August 2014, Lee Wilson made history by becoming the first player to play for Mansfield Town and Mansfield Cricket Club. He now works as a senior scout for Hull City A.F.C. after holding positions in same role at Swansea, WBA and Norwich.

External links

Lee Wilson career stats at TheGingerBreads.co.uk

1972 births
Living people
English footballers
Clipstone F.C. players
Mansfield Town F.C. players
Telford United F.C. players
Dagenham & Redbridge F.C. players
Halifax Town A.F.C. players
Tamworth F.C. players
Grantham Town F.C. players
Solihull Borough F.C. players
King's Lynn F.C. players
Glapwell F.C. players
Association football forwards
Footballers from Mansfield
Sutton Town A.F.C. players
Shepshed Dynamo F.C. managers
Gedling Town F.C. managers
Glapwell F.C. managers
Sutton Town A.F.C. managers
Spalding United F.C. players
English football managers